The Tuba-Shahi Mosque is a historical and architectural monument of the 15th century located in the Mardakan village of the Khazar district in Baku (Azerbaijan). The mosque is included in the list of the historical and architectural monuments of local importance approved by the Cabinet of Ministers of the Republic of Azerbaijan. It was built not far from the Quadrangular Mardakan Castle dating back to the era of the Shirvanshahs. 

The mosque is named after Tuba Shahi, a woman who commissioned the construction of the edifice. The inscription on the mosque indicates that it was built in 1481-1482. In 1720-1721 at the order of Muhammad Khan, the Baku Khan, restoration works were carried out in the building.

The mosque has a clearly defined volume in the form of a parallelepiped completed with a dome. The central part of the prayer hall is covered with a dome resting on sails. On four sides, the central prayer hall is adjoined by lateral rectangular rooms.

History 
The mosque is named after Tuba Shahi, a woman who commissioned the construction of the edifice. The inscription on the mosque indicates that it was built in 1481-1482. Another inscription is located at the entrance to a narrow spiral staircase leading to the roof. This inscription, obviously belonging to an older mosque in the village, indicates the time of its construction – Muharram 774 AH (1372) and carries the name of the customer - Sadr Haji Baha-ad-Din, son of Khoja Nur-ad-Din, son of Mahmud Abayil.

Describing the sights of Absheron, I. Berezin wrote: “The most wonderful of the nearby villages and perhaps the most wonderful on the entire Absheron Peninsula is Merdkhan, Merdakan, Merdakhane or, finally, Mardakent. Its population is not significant, but there is a rather elegant mosque built in 886 (1481-1482) by Khalil Ulloy, and another fortification built by Mirza Muhammad Khan, probably the ruler of Baku, in 1133 (1720-1721), as indicated by the Arabic inscriptions on the mosque and the fortification.”

M. A. Shikhaliyev and A. U. Yuzbashov note that at one time the mosque and the castle were the main buildings of the village where streets with one-story houses ran around them. Today, the characteristic dome of the mosque stands out above the panorama of the village surrounded on all sides by two-story houses with the exception of the main facade.

Architectural features 
The mosque has a clearly defined volume in the form of a parallelepiped being completed with a dome. On its plan, the mosque is approaching the shape of a square with the sides of 11.30 and 12.90 meters.

The central part of the prayer hall is covered with a dome resting on sails. The base of the dome hangs into the interior of the room as a 5-cm shelf. The dome is supported by four massive stone pillars more than 1 meter wide which separate the prayer hall of the mosque from the other corner rooms. On four sides, the central square is adjoined by lateral rectangular rooms covered with stone vaults. In the corners, there are four small rectangular rooms connected to the prayer hall through lancet openings. The overlap of the first corner section adjacent to the entrance is made in the form of an ogival arch. The second section is covered similarly. The roof structure of the third section is made in the form of a dome on an octagonal base. And, finally, the ceiling of the fourth section has a star shape, formed by overlapping the overlying rows of the masonry.

The portal of the mosque, located to east, is solved in the form of a large ledge with a deep portal niche. The latter also has a star-shaped overlap of a rather complex pattern. Through the entrance portal, the visitor enters the corner section, and from here into the central premises of the mosque. The mosque itself was built from the local limestone with lime mortar. All four facades are lined with teska stone. The walls of the mosque are on average up to 1.9 m thick.

Just like the facades, the surface of the walls inside is lined with pure stone. The outer generating the central dome has a lancet shape of a gentle outline. The twelve-sided drum on which the central dome rests is crowned with a small cornice. The described planned solution of the mosque, which is widespread in the mosques on Absheron, acquires a traditional approach and is often used for other types of structures, such as the turbe of the Shirvanshahs' Palace Complex of the 15th century, the "Khan's Country House" (14th century) in Nardaran, and other monuments with the only difference being marked by the entrance - designed in the form of a portal, either placed on the main axis of the building, or knocked down to the one of the end sides.

Among the monument's details, it is worth noting the window stone bars, which are a rather complex geometric ornament. Of all the openings, only two have the same lattice pattern. This kind of stone gratings is characteristic to the Shirvan-Absheron architectural school and is often found in the monuments of Absheron both in the earlier periods and in the 15th century (Mausoleum of Seyid Yahya Bakuvi, Shah Mosque, Gileyli Mosque in Baku, Diri Baba Mausoleum, Shamakhi Juma Mosque, etc.).

See also
 List of mosques in Azerbaijan

References

Religious buildings and structures completed in 1482
Mosques in Baku
Monuments and memorials in Azerbaijan
15th-century mosques